Firebrand Books is a publishing house established in 1984 by Nancy K. Bereano---a lesbian/feminist activist in Ithaca, NY.  Karen Oosterhouse, publisher since 2003, describes Firebrand as "the independent publisher of record for feminist and lesbian fiction and nonfiction," championing "authors whose work has been marginalized: women of color, women coming out of poverty, transwomen, the genderqueer, and other underrepresented voices." It is among the many feminist and lesbian publishing houses that grew out of the Women's Press Movement; other presses of that period include Naiad Press, Persephone and Kitchen Table: Women of Color Press.

From 1984 to 2000, Firebrand Books published literary fiction, nonfiction, and poetry on lesbian and feminist themes, placing publisher Nancy Bereano "at the forefront of lesbian and small press publishing."  Firebrand was the first publisher of Dorothy Allison's 1988 short story collection Trash, which subsequently won double Lambda Literary Awards in the categories of Lesbian Fiction and Small Press, and of the "Dykes to Watch Out For" series by Alison Bechdel.

The press has published poetry, fiction, and non-fiction by many luminary authors, including Jewelle Gomez, Leslie Feinberg, Cheryl Clarke, Ruthann Robson, Lesléa Newman, Mab Segrest, Leslie Feinberg, Judith Katz, Audre Lorde, and Minnie Bruce Pratt, earning four American Library Association Gay/Lesbian/Bisexual Book Awards and 12 Lambda Literary Awards, including the Publisher's Service Award for Bereano, in 1996. On Bereano's influential role as an editor and publisher, Alison Bechdel writes: "she discovered me and published my first book when I was a punk kid....She also urged me to write a graphic novel long before the current craze, and that was the beginning of Fun Home."

Bereano has emphasized the importance of small independent presses in supporting and promoting "new ways of thinking," especially for readers marginalized by large publishing houses.  Citing her experiences publishing the work of Audre Lorde, Bereano writes:The fact that [Lorde's] prose was published exclusively by small independently owned women’s presses was both a result of the major houses’ narrow perspective and the fact that Audre Lorde’s prose, particularly her myth-shattering essays, was instrumental in framing a changing reality for many women, primarily lesbian women (a readership long dismissed by the mainstream publishing world).After Bereano's retirement in 1994, Firebrand Books was sold, first to distributor LPC Group, and eventually to Karen Oosterhouse, who relocated the press from Ithaca to Ann Arbor, Michigan, in 2003. In a 2009 interview, Oosterhouse stated that, "perhaps there will come a day when there is no longer a need for a specifically lesbian and feminist press, but for now Firebrand is that press."

On October 5, 2022, the building that once housed Firebrand Books's headquarters (located on the Ithaca Commons, at 143 East State Street) was designated a local historic landmark by the Ithaca Common Council. The Firebrand Books Building is the first Ithaca landmark related to women's and LGBTQ history and is the first landmark in Upstate New York with a primary connection to LGBTQ history. The nomination was authored and spearheaded by Jeff Iovannone, a historian specializing in LGBTQ heritage conservation pursuing a graduate degree in Historic Preservation Planning from Cornell University.

Notable Works
 Skin: Talking About Sex, Class And Literature by Dorothy Allison
 Dykes to Watch Out For by Alison Bechdel
 Mohawk Trail by Beth Brant
 Shoulders by Georgia Cotrell
 Stone Butch Blues by Leslie Feinberg
 Moll Cutpurse by Ellen Galford

See also 
 Lesbian literature
 LGBT literature
 Lambda Literary Award
 American Library Association

References

External links
 Guide to the Firebrand Books Records, 1984-2000.  Division of Rare and Manuscript Collections, Cornell University Library.

Companies based in Ann Arbor, Michigan
Book publishing companies based in Michigan
Feminism in the United States
Lesbian culture in New York (state)
Lesbian feminist literature
Lesbian literature
LGBT literature in the United States
Feminism in New York (state)
Women in Michigan
LGBT book publishing companies
Feminist book publishing companies